N,O-Bis(trimethylsilyl)trifluoroacetamide (BSTFA) is a chemical compound that is used to derivatise labile groups such as hydroxyl on other chemicals, with the more stable trimethylsilyl group, which protects the labile group and allows the compound to be used for analytical purposes or as a chemical reagent for synthesis of more complex molecules. Siloxanes are usually more volatile than the corresponding hydroxyl compounds, and thus can be analyzed with gas chromatography better than the parent compound.

References

Trimethylsilyl compounds